Carseldine is a suburb in the City of Brisbane, Queensland, Australia.

Geography

The suburb is bounded by the North Coast railway line to the east with the Carseldine railway station serving the suburb. Gympie Road enters the suburb from the south (Aspley) and exits to the north-west (Bald Hills). 

Carseldine is a mainly residential suburb in the north of Brisbane.

At its northern boundary is the Carseldine Homemaker Centre. This Homemaker Centre includes one of north Brisbane's three Bunnings Warehouse stores, which became a part of the Carseldine Homemaker Centre in 2002 (Bunnings previously traded individually there for about 4 years). There is also a community-based shopping centre anchored by a Woolworths supermarket on Beams Road and two convenience centres, one beside the railway station and the other on the western side of the suburb. Carseldine also includes two plant nurseries (one small and one large, both located along Beams Road), Club Coops and the Aspley Hornets AFL Club. Carseldine Police Station, an $8.4 million facility, located on the corner of Gympie Road and Denver Road commenced operations on 29 September 2009.

History
Carseldine was named on 16 August 1975 by the Queensland Place Names Board after the fencing contractor William Carseldine (also written as Castledean) who immigrated in 1854 in the sailing ship Monsoon and settled in Bald Hills in 1858, also owning land in the Carseldine area.

North Brisbane College of Advanced Education opened in 1975 with the pre-existing Kedron Park Teachers College and with a new campus at Carseldine. It later became a campus of the Queensland Institute of Technology and then as a campus of the Queensland University of Technology (QUT). In November 2008, QUT relocated its Carseldine activities to its Kelvin Grove and Gardens Point campuses. The site was vacant for four years when QUT failed to find a replacement education provider, but was adapted to house state public servants in 2012. In 2016, Deputy Premier Jackie Trad announced that the site would be redeveloped as the Carseldine Urban Village, with 900 homes and commercial and retail space.

The median age of the Carseldine population was 40 years of age, 2 years above the Australian median. Children aged under 15 years made up 16.7% of the population and people aged 65 years and over made up 22.1% of the population. 64.1% of people living in Carseldine were born in Australia, compared to the national average of 66.7%; the next most common countries of birth were India 4.6%, New Zealand 4.1%, England 3.1%, Philippines 1.9% and South Africa 1.6%. 73.8% of people only spoke English at home. Other languages spoken at home included Mandarin 1.8%, Hindi 1.8%, Cantonese 1.5%, Italian 1.5% and Malayalam 1.3%. The most common responses for religion were Catholic 30.2%, No Religion 21.9% and Anglican 12.6%.

Heritage listings
Heritage-listed sites in Carseldine include:

 736 Beams Road: Holy Spirit Centre (also known as Holy Spirit Convent)
 112 Graham Road: Elliot Farmhouse (also known as Graham Farmhouse)
 2 Hawbridge Street: Brisbane Mud Springs Park (also known as Aspley Mud Mounds)

Education
There are no schools in Carseldine. The nearest government primary schools are Aspley East State School in neighbouring Aspley to the south, Bald Hills State School in neighbouring Bald Hills to the north-east, and Taigum State School in Taigum to the east. The nearest government secondary school is Aspley State High School in neighbouring Aspley to the south.

Facilities
Carseldine Police Station is at 1615 Gympie Road.

Amentities
There are a number of parks in the suburb, including:

 Allira Crescent Park
 Aspley Rest Park

 Balcara Avenue Park

 Beams Road Park (no.440)

 Bensara Place Park

 Bowden Street Park

 Boxwood Place Park

 Chateau Street Park

 Cowie Road Park

 Dannenberg Street Park

 Hawbridge Street Park

 Kentia Street Park

 Lacey Road Park

 Macaranga Crescent Park

 Matisse Street Park

 Matthew Gardiner Park

 Nilkerie Street Park

 Pat Rafter Park, named after tennis champion Pat Rafter

 Philip Vaughan Park

 Ray Street Park

 Strawberry Farm Park

Transport
The suburb includes Carseldine railway station, located on the eastern side of the suburb. This provides Carseldine with regular train services, connecting to the Brisbane central business district and northern suburbs. Also, Carseldine is well serviced by buses operated by the Brisbane City Council.

In the 2016 census, 15.4% of employed people travelled to work on public transport and 67.9% travelled by car (either as driver or as passenger).

References

Further reading

 

  — full text available for download

External links
 
 

Suburbs of the City of Brisbane